Prelude' is an album by organist Jack McDuff recorded in 1963 and released on the Prestige label.

Reception
Allmusic awarded the album 4 stars stating "Prelude was a successful match of McDuff's small-combo organ jazz with big band arrangements by Benny Golson. In part, that was because the blend was well-executed, never fighting with or drowning out McDuff's organ. But it was also because the mixture made it stand out amidst the scads of organ jazz records being churned out in the early '60s".

Track listing 
All compositions by Jack McDuff except as indicated
 "A Kettle of Fish" - 3:55  
 "Candlelight" - 2:54
 "Put On a Happy Face" (Lee Adams, Charles Strouse) - 3:13
 "Prelude" (Benny Golson) - 8:41
 "Mean to Me" (Fred E. Ahlert, Roy Turk) - 3:57  
 "Carry Me Home" - 4:30
 "Easy Living" (Ralph Rainger, Leo Robin) - 3:44
 "Oh! Look at Me Now" (Joe Bushkin, John DeVries) - 4:28
 "Dig Cousin Will" - 4:16

Personnel 
Jack McDuff - organ
Jerry Kail, Danny Stiles - trumpet
Billy Byers, Burt Collins, Tom McIntosh - trombone
Don Ashworth, Bob Northern - French horn
Red Holloway - tenor saxophone
Marvin Holliday, George Marge - baritone saxophone
George Benson - guitar
Richard Davis - bass
Joe Dukes, Mel Lewis - drums
Benny Golson - conductor, arranger

References 

Jack McDuff albums
1964 albums
Prestige Records albums
Albums arranged by Benny Golson